The House of Lords International Relations and Defence Committee, previously just the International Relations Committee, is a select committee of the House of Lords in the Parliament of the United Kingdom. The remit of the Committee is to "consider the United Kingdom's international relations". The committee was recommended by the House of Lords Liaison Committee in its report on 29 October 2015 and agreed by the House on 10 November 2015.

Membership
As of January 2023, the membership of the committee is as follows:

See also
Parliamentary Committees of the United Kingdom

References

External links
House of Lords International Relations and Defence Committee

Committees of the House of Lords
Parliamentary committees on Foreign Affairs
Parliamentary committees on Defence